Cao Miaoqing (14th-century), was a Chinese poet, calligrapher and musician. She was a student of Guan Yunshi and Ban Weizhi, and Yang Weizhen, who included her work in Xian' ge ji, called her the heiress of Ban Zhao.

See also
List of Female Calligraphers

References 
 Lily Xiao Hong Lee, Sue Wiles: Biographical Dictionary of Chinese Women, Volume II: Tang Through Ming 618 - 1644

14th-century Chinese people
14th-century Chinese poets
Chinese women musicians
Yuan dynasty calligraphers
Women calligraphers
14th-century Chinese calligraphers
14th-century Chinese women writers
14th-century Chinese women musicians